Democratic liberalism aims to reach a synthesis of democracy which is the participation of the people in the power and liberalism, a political and/or social philosophy advocating the freedom of the individual. It arose after World War I (with most major nations enacting universal suffrage) and its main question was how to get the population involved and interested in politics outside of elections.    

The British Liberal Democrats describe their ideology as giving "power to the people" as they are against the concentration of power in unaccountable bodies. They propose decentralisation of power out of Westminster and electoral and parliamentary reform to create a system of tiered government structures to make decisions at what they see as the right level, including regional assemblies, the European Union and international organisations. The Liberal Democrats want to protect civil liberties and oppose state intervention in personal affairs. In his Democratic Liberalism: The Politics of Dignity, Craig Duncan says:

References

External links 
 Liberal Democrats (British Political Party)
 Craig Ducan's Home Page

Liberalism